is a Japanese professional golfer.

Kuwabara, graduate of Aichi Gakuin University, plays on the Japan Golf Tour and has won twice.

Professional wins (5)

Japan Golf Tour wins (2)

Japan Challenge Tour wins (2)
1992 Korakuen Cup (4th)
2013 Heiwa PGM Challenge III Road to Championship

Other wins (1)
2009 Hokkaido Open

Team appearances
World Cup (representing Japan): 1996
Dynasty Cup (representing Japan): 2003

References

External links

Japanese male golfers
Japan Golf Tour golfers
Asian Games medalists in golf
Asian Games gold medalists for Japan
Golfers at the 1990 Asian Games
Medalists at the 1990 Asian Games
Sportspeople from Aichi Prefecture
1969 births
Living people